8 Draconis, formally named Taiyi , is a single star in the northern circumpolar constellation of Draco. Based upon an annual parallax shift of 34.14 mas as seen from the Earth, the star is located approximately 96 light-years from the Sun. It is moving further away with a heliocentric radial velocity of +9 km/s, having come within  some 2.6 million years ago.

This is an F-type main-sequence star with a stellar classification of F1VmA7(n). It is a Gamma Doradus variable star with a brightness variation of about one tenth of a magnitude. 8 Dra has a relatively high rate of rotation, showing a projected rotational velocity of 120 km/s. The star has 1.56 times the mass of the Sun and 1.50 times the Sun's radius. It is radiating 5.75 times the Sun's luminosity from its photosphere at an effective temperature of 7,129 K. An infrared excess has been detected at wavelengths of 24 and 70μm, which suggests the presence of a circumstellar disk orbiting the star.

Nomenclature 

8 Draconis is the star's Flamsteed designation.  It also received the variable star designation IR Draconis in 2000, after its variability had been discovered using Hipparcos photometry.

The star bore the traditional Chinese name of Taiyi, from 太乙 (Tài Yǐ) or 太一 (Tài Yī, the Great One), both of which refer to Tao. In 2016, the International Astronomical Union organized a Working Group on Star Names (WGSN) to catalogue and standardize proper names for stars. The WGSN approved the name Taiyi for this star on 30 June 2017 and it is now so entered on the List of IAU-approved Star Names.

References

F-type main-sequence stars
Gamma Doradus variables
Circumstellar disks
Draco (constellation)
Draconis, 08
112429
063076
4916
Draconis, IR
Taiyi